The 2009 Volta a Catalunya was the 89th edition of the Volta. It took place between 18 May and 24 May, and was part of both the ProTour and the inaugural World Calendar. It began with a short individual time trial in Lloret de Mar and ended in Montmeló at the Circuit de Catalunya.

Teams
As the Volta a Catalunya is a UCI ProTour event, all 18 ProTour teams were invited automatically. They were joined by three Professional Continental teams.

Andalucía–CajaSur

Contentpolis-Ampo

Route

Stages

Stage 1
18 May 2009 – Lloret de Mar, 3.6 km (ITT)

The course for the brief individual time trial is perfectly flat.

Despite clocking in ten seconds slower than he had on the identical course in the 2008 Volta, Thor Hushovd was the winner of the short individual time trial for the second year in a row, narrowly edging out Alejandro Valverde to don the first white jersey.

Stage 2
19 May 2009 – Girona to Roses, 163.1 km

This course was hilly, with three categorized climbs, including one about 15 kilometers from the finish.

A four-man breakaway was away for much of the stage. They claimed the intermediate sprints and the first two climbs, putting Samuel Dumoulin and Lloyd Mondory, respectively, in the leading jerseys for those classifications. They were caught on the last climb of the day, the Alt de San Pere De Rodes, during which race leader Thor Hushovd was dropped and his Cervélo team decided to work for Xavier Florencio. A group of 54 riders was together at the finish for a final sprint, won by Matti Breschel. The race lead transferred to Alejandro Valverde, who was surprised to get it, since he did not contest the sprint and did not get any time bonuses.

Stage 3
20 May 2009 – Roses to La Pobla de Lillet, 182.8 km

This was a mountainous stage, and it was thought to see a definitive split between those riders who aimed for the final podium and those who didn't. The stage started at sea level, but climbed to 1,031 meters after about 80 kilometers on the road. There were two other categorized climbs on the course, including a steep climb to 1,200 meters right before the end of the stage, which came on the descent from that climb.

This stage saw race leader Alejandro Valverde extend his lead with a stage win. After the peloton, paced by his team Caisse d'Epargne, caught the morning's breakaway, Valverde himself attacked at the foot of the day's last climb, and the group of nine GC contenders who were able to hold his wheel contested the finish together.

Stage 4
21 May 2009 – La Pobla de Lillet to Vallnord Sector Pal (Andorra),  175.7 km

This stage was undulating at first, and then became mountainous. The Coll del Port (a pass in Catalonia, not to be confused with the pass in France with a very similar name) was visited, and the finish into Andorra was an outside categorization climb, which began 10 kilometers from the finish line. It has been called the 2009 Volta's queen stage.

This stage was conquered by a member of the morning's breakaway, Julián Sánchez. Sánchez and seven others who came clear of the peloton early on in the stage. While the others were absorbed before the Vallnord climb, Sánchez still had a 90-second lead at its foot and managed to stay away just long enough, giving victory in the queen stage of this UCI ProTour event to a non-ProTour team. The GC favorites who had otherwise dominated on the climb were within a kilometer of Sánchez at the finish, with Dan Martin coming the closest to catching him, for second on the stage and a slight time again against race leader Alejandro Valverde. Martin moved from sixth to second in the GC after the stage. As the stages that follow this one are all seen as potentially sprinters' stages, Valverde's team made it clear after this stage that they would work with the teams of the sprinters to ensure mass finishes the rest of the way and protect his 15-second lead over Martin.

Stage 5
22 May 2009 – La Seu d'Urgell to Torredembarra, 201.3 km

A fair amount of descending faced the riders in this stage, being that it began at 670 meters in elevation and ended near sea level. Most of the descending took place right before the finish line.

A four-man breakaway came clear of the peloton within the first 10 km of the stage. Their maximum advantage was 4' 30", with Steven Cozza attacking and staying out front for a short while as the peloton absorbed his three breakaway mates. Cozza was also eventually caught, and the finish was contested in a mass sprint, won by Katusha's Nikolay Trusov. Team Katusha came to the Volta thinking that Alexei Markov would be their primary sprinter, but Markov was not with the peloton at the finish. They therefore worked for Trusov in the sprint, as he narrowly edged out accomplished sprinter Thor Hushovd at the line. The top ten in the GC were unchanged by the day's results.

Stage 6
23 May 2009 – Torredembarra to Barcelona, 150.5 km

This stage was expected to end in a mass sprint, in spite of the three categorized climbs the course featured. In the last 40 kilometers, there was only a very short climb and a lengthy flat stretch to the finish.

The sprint indeed took place, with the man who was pipped at the line the day before, Thor Hushovd, coming across the line first to claim his second stage win of the Volta. The lead in the mountains classification transferred to Julián Sánchez, who was tied with Xavier Tondó by points, but got the jersey because of his victory on the outside categorization climb in Stage 4. The top ten in the GC were again unchanged, and with only a very short, very flat stage remaining, it was believed that they would be unchanged again for the end of the race.

Stage 7
24 May 2009 – Centre d'Alt Rendiment to Circuit de Catalunya Montmeló, 110.8 km

This course climbed to just over 600 meters. The climb was originally uncategorized, but with Xavier Tondó and Julián Sánchez tied by points for the King of the Mountains jersey, race officials decided to offer points for the climb to have a definitive winner in that classification. The descent from that height took about 50 kilometers, with 10 flat kilometers to race before the finish at the race track in Montmeló.

The short distance and relatively flat profile of the stage kept any breakaways from staying clear. Sánchez managed to outsprint Tondó to the summit of the climb to clinch the red jersey victory for the Contentpolis rider. The majority of the peloton was together for the finish, a sprint which was won by Columbia–High Road's Greg Henderson.

Riders' jersey progress table
In the 2009 Volta a Catalunya, three different jerseys were awarded. For the general classification, calculated by adding the finishing times of the stages per cyclist, and allowing time bonuses for the first three finishers on mass start stages, the leader received a white jersey with green stripes on the sleeves. This classification is considered the most important of the Volta a Catalunya, and the winner of the general classification is considered the winner of the Volta a Catalunya.

Additionally, there was also a sprint classification, indicated with a blue jersey. In the sprint classification, cyclists got points for being one of the first three in intermediate sprints, with six points awarded for first place, four for second, and two for third.

There was also a mountains classification, indicated with a red jersey. In the mountains classifications, points are won by reaching the top of a mountain before other cyclists. All climbs were categorized, with most either first, second, third, or fourth-category, with more points available for the higher-categorized climbs. There was also an outside categorization climb at the end of Stage 4, which awarded even more points than the first-category climbs.

References

External links
  
  
cyclingnews.com

2009
Volta
2009 in Spanish road cycling
2009 UCI ProTour
2009 in Andorran sport
2009 UCI World Ranking
Cycle races in Andorra
May 2009 sports events in Europe